The Maa Civil Society Forum is an association of various NGOs, organisations and individuals formed to promote land rights claims of the Maasai people of Kenya.  The group is committed to peaceful means, and intends to achieve its aims through dialogue with the Kenyan and British governments, and through a legal case challenging the legitimacy of the 1904 Anglo-Maasai Treaty.

References

INTIMIDATION, POLICE HARASSMENT AND BRUTAL TORTURE OF THE MAASAI OF KENYA FOR AGITATING FOR THEIR BIRTHRIGHT – LAND by Joseph Ole Simel. Accessed 12 May 2006.

Political organisations based in Kenya